The 1931 Tennessee Volunteers football team (variously "Tennessee", "UT" or the "Vols") represented the University of Tennessee in the 1931 Southern Conference football season. Playing as a member of the Southern Conference (SoCon), the team was led by head coach Robert Neyland, in his sixth year, and played their home games at Shields–Watkins Field in Knoxville, Tennessee. The 1931 Vols won nine, lost zero and tied one game (9–0–1 overall, 6–0–1 in the SoCon).  On October 17, Tennessee avenged their only loss from the previous season and beat Alabama; this was the only loss for the Crimson Tide in 1931. For the third time in four years, Kentucky spoiled Tennessee's bid for a perfect season with a tie.  Tennessee concluded the 1931 season on December 7 with a charity game at Yankee Stadium against NYU.  The 1931 Vols outscored their opponents 243 to 15 and posted eight shutouts.

Schedule

Players

Line

Backfield

References

Tennessee
Tennessee Volunteers football seasons
College football undefeated seasons
Tennessee Volunteers football